The Bulgarian Air Force is one of the three branches of the Military of Bulgaria, the other two being the Bulgarian Navy and Bulgarian land forces. Its mission is to guard and protect the sovereignty of Bulgarian airspace, and jointly with the other branches, to protect territorial integrity. The Bulgarian Air Force is one of the oldest air forces in Europe and the world. In recent times it has been actively taking part in numerous NATO missions and exercises in Europe.

The current commanding officer of the Bulgarian Air Force is Major General Dimitar Hristov Petrov.

History

Early years

The Bulgarian Air Force dates back to the end of the 19th century. At the 1892 Plovdiv International Fair, two lieutenants of the Bulgarian Army flew in the 'La France' balloon owned by the Frenchman Eugène Godard. Later, inspired by the flight, they succeeded in convincing the Bulgarian General Staff that the Army should build a balloon force. Despite numerous refusals from military schools around Europe who would not teach Bulgarian officers to use airships, eventually the Imperial Aviation School in St. Petersburg enrolled Lieutenant Vasil Zlatarov as a student. On 20 April 1906 "Vazduhoplavatelno Otdelenie" (roughly translated as Aviation Squad) was created to operate observation balloons for the Army, initially as a part of Railway Battalion. After graduation Lt. Zlatarov was appointed its first commander. After operating small balloons, in 1911 a bigger Godard balloon was bought, and in 1912 the first indigenous balloon, Sofia-1, was constructed in Bulgaria using materials bought from Russia.

In 1910, a Russian aircraft engineer, Boris Maslennikov, was invited to Bulgaria, where he presented his airplane, a modification of the French Farman III. Following his demonstration, assisted by Vasil Zlatarov over the hippodrome in Sofia, the Bulgarian Government decided to acquire airplanes for The Aviation Corps. In early 1912 thirteen army officers were sent abroad for training as pilots and orders were placed for five French, British and German airplanes. The officers sent to France completed their training first and returned to Bulgaria in July 1912. The same year Bulgaria received its first airplane – a Bleriot XXI, which Simeon Petrov flew on 13 August 1912 to become the first Bulgarian to pilot an airplane over Bulgaria.

First and Second Balkan Wars

Following the outbreak of the First Balkan War, Bulgarian pilots, while still abroad, hastily procured aircraft to be shipped home after them and foreign volunteer pilots converged from all over Europe to fly for Bulgaria. After the front lines had stabilized, an Aeroplane Platoon was established at a new airfield close to the fighting.

Intelligence about the Turkish army strength and dispositions in the Edirne was required, and on 16 October 1912, two aviators performed a reconnaissance flight over the city in an Albatros F.2 biplane, also dropping two bombs. This was not only the first military mission performed by a Bulgarian aircraft, but also the first combat use of an aircraft in Europe and one of the first bombing attacks.

Later that month the Bulgarian Aviation Corps was expanded to three Aeroplane Platoons. Foreign volunteers began flying operational sorties alongside Bulgarian pilots and carried out reconnaissance, leaflet-dropping and bombing missions. During the war at least three aircraft were shot down. Considerable help was received from the Russians in terms of aircraft, maintenance and training. Due to low aircraft serviceability and frequent accidents, the number of missions flown was relatively low. Despite that, the Bulgarian airmen and their foreign allies were able to gather enough intelligence for the Army General Staff to help successfully capture of the city after a long siege. Although inflicting little physical damage, the bombs had a devastating effect on the defending Turkish garrison's morale and played a crucial part in the fall of the city, which was until then considered nearly impregnable.
During the First Balkan War Bulgarian aviation undertook 70 combat sorties, including 11 bombing raids, during the Second Balkan War it undertook 6 sorties. All in all, during both wars, there were over 230 aircraft sorties, including non-combat flights. In addition to the Albatros F.2, Bulgaria flew Blériot XI and XXI, Bristol Prier, Farman VII and Nieuport IV aircraft, as well as examples provided by Sommer and Voisin.

World War I (1914–1918)

Army air action
The Kingdom of Bulgaria entered World War I as an ally of the Central Powers on 4 October 1915. The Aeroplane Section of the Bulgarian Army was reformed with assistance from Germany and Austria. Aircraft were deployed to Kumanovo Airfield in support of advancing Bulgarian forces, but bad weather initially prevented any flying. Until then they had completed 11 combat sorties from an airfield in Sofia (now the central railway station). As the frontline advanced, the unit re-deployed to airfields near Belitsa and Xanthi, in modern Greece. Newly acquired German LVG aircraft were hastily pressed into action. Two more airfields were constructed near Udovo and Levunovo. The Allies began flying reconnaissance and bomber sorties against Bulgarian units on the Southern Balkan Front. Throughout World War I Bulgarian military aviation experienced a steady increase in both numbers and quality of aircraft; however, they remained inferior to those flown by the Allies, especially the British and French. The First Aeroplane Section (the country's only aircraft unit) was attached to the Second Bulgarian Army. It flew 255 sorties compared to 397 flown by the four squadrons of the Entente it opposed, and operated the following types:

 12 LVG B.II – reconnaissance aircraft, the first group of six arriving in November 1915. Those two seaters were also used as fighters by the Bulgarians, as dedicated "scouts" were not available.
 13 Otto C.I – a twin-tailed pusher bomber. The first Otto in arrived in May 1916.
 18 Albatros C.III – reconnaissance aircraft, also used as trainers. First delivery in August 1916.
 12 DFW C.V – reconnaissance aircraft, first arrived in August 1917.
 6 Roland D.II fighters. During July 1917 the first of these arrived with the Section.
 6 Roland D.III fighters, the first arriving at the end of 1917.
 3 Fokker E.III fighters, first of these delivered in the spring of 1916.
 8 Fokker D.VII – the best fighter used by Bulgaria in World War I. Delivery took place in September 1918 and they saw no action. 7 were scrapped in accordance with the peace treaty. The 8th flew as a two-seater after the war.
 2 Albatros C.I. These were ordered by the Ottoman Empire before Bulgaria entered the war. During early 1915 a couple landed on then neutral Bulgarian territory after a navigational error, and they were seized.

In addition, the Bulgarian Navy used the following airplanes:
 8 Friedrichshafen FF.33 floatplane bombers, starting in 1916
 2 Rumpler 6B1 floatplane fighters, starting in 1916

A number of Bulgarian pilots flew with German air units at the Western Front and at Xanthi. They operated several types, including the Albatros D.III and Halberstadt, which would later mistakenly be listed on the Bulgarian inventory by some sources.

Captured Allied aircraft

On 30 September 1916 a French Farman F.40 bomber of Escadrille 384 was tasked with attacking the Bulgarian capital, Sofia. Two Bulgarian Fokker E.IIIs were positioned south of Sofia to intercept the intruder, while a flight of three armed Albatros C.III two-seat trainers covered the center of the city as backup. The bomber successfully dropped its bombs over Sofia while escaping anti-aircraft fire but, while departing, was attacked by the Bulgarian Fokkers, one piloted by Marko Parvanov, which brought the Farman down with a dead engine.

Another Allied aircraft, a British Armstrong Whitworth F.K.3, was captured by Bulgarian troops on 12 February 1917 after engine problems forced it to land. Both it and the crew were captured. It would receive Bulgarian insignia and be used to bomb Allied positions at night. Four such sorties were flown before being shot down on 23 May 1918.

A Nieuport 24bis and a Nieuport 27 were also captured. Lieutenant Vladimir Balan, a Bulgarian fighter pilot who had been flying with a German Jasta on the Western Front, was flying one of the Nieuports when he shot down the squadron leader of No. 17 Squadron RAF.

Naval air action
Bulgarian naval aviators also played an important role in the air war. In 1912 Petty-Officers Lyapchev and Mikhailov were sent, along with other officers and seamen, to the German naval aviation forming facilities for training. Another group of naval personnel followed in the beginning of the First World War. Training was held at List, Nordenhai and Kiel. In November 1915 a seaplane station under German control was established near Varna, initially operating four Friedrichshafen FF.33 bombers and a Rumpler 6B1 fighter. Later, at the coast of the Varna Lake, a second seaplane station was built (this one under Bulgarian control), operating the same inventory. Near Sozopol a forward fuel and ammunition replenishment base was established in support of patrol flights over the southern Bulgarian coastline. At the end of 1917 the German station was transferred to the Bulgarian Navy. At the time of the armistice the Bulgarian fleet air arm comprised two seaplane stations, a forward replenishment base, three hangars, three workshops, ammunition warehouses and 10 seaplanes. After the cease-fire the machines were used for mine reconnaissance. At the end of 1919 they are transported by train to Bozhurishte Airfield to be scrapped along with the army aviation inventory.

The Bulgarian balloon observers also took part in the war. They were most active on the Dobrudzha Front, where aircraft activities were scarce (a German bomber squadron, flying missions against Bucharest and Constanţa: "Gotha" bombers accounted for the most flights). Near the Bulgarian city of Yambol an airship hangar was constructed to house German airships. The airship Schütte-Lanz SL 10 was the first to use it. According to documents of the time it was assigned to the Bulgarian Army, but was actually under German control. It was lost during a flight over the Black Sea in July 1916. In August 1916 the LZ 101 replaced it. After performing raids on targets in Romania and Greece it returned to Germany in August 1917. In November 1917 the naval airship L 59 arrived. That airship flew a series of remarkable missions, such as an attempted resupply of the garrison in the colony German East Africa and the bombing of Naples and Port Said. During a mission against the British naval base in Malta, a lightning strike over the Mediterranean Sea set it alight and completely destroyed it. All hands were lost.

Destruction and survival under the peace treaty (1919–1936)
On 4 October 1918 the Bulgarian Tsar issued a Royal Act of Demobilization. This resulted in military aviation being converted to its peacetime structure. The Aeroplane group, based in Bozhurishte comprised the following: 
 Two aeroplane companies
 An aeroplane school
 An aeroplane atelliér
 An aeroplane depot
The Chaika Naval Seaplane station at Varna was under Naval command.

On 27 November 1919 the Treaty of Neuilly-sur-Seine was signed. In accordance with the treaty the Kingdom of Bulgaria was banned from operating military aircraft under any form for the next 20 years. All Bulgarian airplanes, balloons, aviation equipment, weaponry and ammunition were to be destroyed under Allied control and all personnel demobilised. Under the terms of the treaty any aircraft procured for civilian purposes had to be bought from the countries on the winning side. The combined engine power for any airplane (including multi-engined ones) was not to exceed 180 hp. In addition, the Bulgarian airspace was to be controlled by the allies and used according to the victorious countries' interests.

In accordance with the treaty during 1920 no less than 70 airplanes, 110 aircraft engines, 3 air balloons, 76 machine guns, a number of photographic cameras and other aviation equipment were destroyed at the military airfield of Bozhurishte. The seaplanes of the Bulgarian Navy were delivered by train to the same airfield and scrapped soon after that.

Due to the devotion of the Air Troops personnel and the help of the population of the surrounding villages, several aircraft were hidden, thus evading Allied inspection following destruction. Seven DFW C.V, Albatros C.III and a single Fokker D.VII were among the survivors. In addition, at least ten aviation engines (Benz Bz.IV and Mercedes D.III) were also saved.

The Bulgarian government tried to get around the ban for military flight activity by establishing a Gendarmery Aeroplane Section in 1919. Since the Gendarmery was at that time a service under the Ministry of War, the creation of the unit was met by fierce opposition by the Allied commission. This almost resulted in the destruction of the whole Vrazhdebna Airfield, but the disbandment of the unit prevented this from happening.

An Aeroflight Section under the Ministry of Railways, Postal Service and Telegraph was created in 1920. Bulgarian aviation personnel assembled two airplanes from hidden spares and parts, salvaged from the destroyed military airplanes. The two aircraft, known as "the mixed planes", recorded about 1000 flight hours altogether. The sole remaining Bulgarian Fokker D.VII was disguised as a two-seater, thus being classified as a trainer and returning to active service.

On 5 July 1923 Bulgaria ratified the International Civil Aviation Treaty. From that moment on its air vehicles would carry a registration in the form B-B??? (the latter three signs being a combination of capital letters). In 1923 the first group of cadets, called "student-flyers" entered the Flying school at Vrazhdebna AF.

The following year (1924) the first new airplanes were acquired. Those were machines of the Potez VIII, Caudron C.59, Hanriot HD.14 and Bristol Tourer Type 29; Avro 522 seaplanes were also procured. During the same year the Bulgarian airplane construction specialist Atanas Grigorov (who obtained his qualification at the "Albatroswerke – Berlin") assembled his seaplane, called "Grigorov-1". The aircraft made several test-flights, recording excellent characteristics, but was damaged beyond repair by a storm in the hangar where it was stationed. Also in 1924 the Aeroplane Section was expanded to an Aeroflight Directorate still under the Ministry of Railways, Postal Service and Telegraph.

1925 saw the Potez XVII, Bristol Lucifer and Macchi 2000/18 flying boat boosting the country's aircraft inventory. The Bulgarian government invited a group of German aircraft engineers, headed by the constructor Herr Hermann Winter to help establish an aviation factory. Named The State's Aeroconstruction Atelliér or Darzhavna Aeroplanna Rabotilnitsa (DAR) the factory was initially managed by the first Bulgarian pilot to achieve an aerial victory – Mr. Marko Parvanov. The first aircraft types produced at the plant were the U-1 or "Uzounov-1" (an indigenous variant of the wartime German DFW C.V) and the DAR 2 (an indigenous variant of the German Albatros C.III of the same era). Both types became well-known and loved by the personnel of the former Air Troops and gained Bulgarian combat service experience. Development of a new type – the DAR 1 – was also started.

During the course of 1926 the Airplane School was moved to the geographical center of the country. The town of Kazanlak was well suited, for it was far away from the Allied Control Commission. The Czechoslovak company Aero Vodochody also built an aircraft factory near that city, but its models were not up to the requirements of the Bulgarian authorities. After an unsuccessful switch to automotive production, the plant was finally sold to the Italian Caproni company. The factory became popular as "Balgarski Kaproni" or "Bulgarian Caproni". The first examples of the DAR 1 biplane were produced and entered service with the Aeroflight Directorate during 1926.

The 1927 structure of the Directorate was the following:
 A fighter , flying the DAR 1
 A bomber , flying the DAR U-1 and DAR 2
 A reconnaissance , flying the Potez XVII
 A seaplane , flying Avro 522 floatplanes and Macchi 2000/18 flying boats
 An aeroplane school, flying the Caudron C.59, the Hanriot HD.14 and the Šmolnik Š.18 (officially known as Letov Š-18)

In 1928 the Ministry of War started the ambitious 10-year program for development of the military aviation (still banned by the peace treaty). According to the plan the following structure had to be achieved:
 4 army fighter orlyaks, each made of two yatos, or overall 8 yatos flying 96 fighter planes
 4 army reconnaissance orlyaks, each made of two , or overall 8  flying 96 reconnaissance planes
 18 divisionary reconnaissance , basically air support aviation, each flying 12 planes or 216 planes altogether
 Strike Aviation Brigade with:
 Fighter Orlyak of 48 machines
 Bomber Orlyak of 36 machines
 Reconnaissance Orlyak of 2 machines
 Maritime Orlyak
 2 seaplane fighter , flying 24 fighters
 2 seaplane bomber , flying 18 bombers

In 1931 Bulgaria signed the Warsaw Treaty, concerning international civil air activities and the country was assigned the new civil registration – LZ-??? (the latter three signs being a combination of capital letters). In 1933 the Bulgarian Council of Ministers approved the following wartime order of battle of the aviation:
 a mixed orlyak of:
 a fighter 
 a bomber 
 a reconnaissance 
 a liaison and photographic survey 
 a maritime 
 a training orlyak
 a Pilot School at Kazanlak airfield
 a balloon company (which was never actually created, as the balloon was considered obsolete for military purposes at the time).
Bulgaria started acquiring German, Czechoslovak and Polish airplanes.

In 1934 the Aviation Regiment was renamed His Majesty's Air Troops, comprising a headquarters, with two army orlyaks (based at Bozhurishte and Plovdiv airfields), a training orlyak (in Plovdiv), a maritime  (at NAS Chaika, Varna) and additional operational support units. Colonel Ivan Mikhailov was appointed the first chief of the air force with Lieutenant-Colonel Georgi Vasilev appointed as his Deputy.

Years of Rebirth (1937–1939)

The first combat aircraft that entered service in the reestablished air force in 1937 were 12 Arado Ar 65 fighters, 12 Heinkel He 51 fighters, 12 Dornier Do 11 bombers and 12 Heinkel He 45B reconnaissance aircraft. These machines were donated personally to Boris III by Hermann Göring.

In 1937, during the traditional military parade of St. George's Day (National Day of Bravery and of the patron-saint of the Bulgarian Armed Forces), military aircraft officially debuted as a part of the armed forces after a nearly two-decade hiatus. A month later Boris III himself presented the Bulgarian air regiments with their new combat flags at an official ceremony at Vrazhdebna Airfield.

In 1937 14 PZL P.24B fighters and 12 PZL.43A light bombers were ordered from Poland, with deliveries starting later that year, while in 1938, orders were placed for 42 more PZL.43B light bombers and 12 PZL.24F fighters, which differed from the earlier aircraft in having more powerful engines.

When the Third Reich occupied Czechoslovakia in 1938, the Czechoslovak air force was broken up. Bulgaria used the opportunity to acquire large numbers of relatively modern ex-Czech aircraft from the Germans at a bargain price. Bulgaria purchased 78 Avia B-534 biplane fighters, 32 Avia B.71 bombers (a license version of the Soviet SB bomber), 12 Bloch MB.200 bombers, 62 Letov Š-328 reconnaissance aircraft and 28 Avia Bs.122 trainers. Deliveries of the second batch of Polish orders started in early 1939, with 33 PZL.43Bs and 8 PZL.11Fs delivered before the German invasion of Poland stopped deliveries (although two more PZL.43Bs were delivered by the Germans later). In less than 3 years the Air Force inventory had grown up to 478 aircraft of which 135 were of Bulgarian construction.

World War II (1939–1945)

At the beginning of World War II, the combat air fleet comprised 374 machines in various roles. In addition orders were placed for 10 Messerschmitt Bf 109E-4 fighters, 11 Dornier Do 17M/P bombers, 6 Messerschmitt Bf 108 light liaison and utility aircraft, 24 Arado Ar 96B-2 and 14 Bücker-Bestmann Bü 131 trainers.

The Air Force order of battle comprised the 1st, 2nd, 3rd and 4th Army Aviation Orlyaks (Army Air Groups or air regiments), each attached to the correspondingly-numbered field army. Each orlyak had a fighter, a line bomber and two reconnaissance  (squadrons). There was also an Independent Aviation corps, which combined the 5th Bomber and 6th Fighter Regiments. The training units consisted of the "Junker" School Orlyak at Vrazhdebna airfield, the 2nd Training Orlyak at Telish airfield (called the Blind Flying Training School) and the 3rd Training Orlyak at Stara Zagora airfield. In 1940, the Bulgarian aviation industry provided the air force with 42 DAR 9 Siniger and 45 Kaproni-Bulgarski KB-5 Chuchuliga aircraft, along with preparing for serial production of the KB-6 – Bulgaria's first twin-engined aircraft. At year's end, the Bulgarians had 595 aircraft (of which 258 were combat aircraft) and 10,287 personnel.

On 1 March 1941, the Kingdom of Bulgaria signed the Tripartite Pact, becoming a formal ally of Germany. Under the treaty, Bulgaria allowed the use of its territory as a staging point for the invasion of Yugoslavia and Greece and some minor logistical support.

Despite the impressive looking inventory, Bulgaria's fighter force in January 1941 consisted of only 91 machines, with just 18 of them modern Bf 109E monoplanes. A further 11 were outdated PZL.24B fighters, and the remainder were Avia B.534 biplanes. The ground-based air defenses were made up of only 8  and 6  AA guns. To help its new ally the 12th Army of the Wehrmacht offered support with its aircraft and air defence assets and provided 8 Freya-type radars dispersed throughout the country. A dispersed observation and reporting system was gradually developed.

The first air strike against Bulgarian targets was carried out by 4 Yugoslav Dornier Do 17 Kb-1 on 6 April 1941 on the city of Kyustendil and its railway station killing 47 and injuring 95, mostly civilians. The air strikes intensified in the following days; British Royal Air Force units based in Greece participated in the attacks as well. At the end of April, the 2nd and 5th Bulgarian armies occupied Greek and Yugoslav territories according to an agreement with the Third Reich. As a part of the joint armed forces' effort on 26 June 1941 6 Avia B.71 and 9 Dornier Do 17M bombers were transferred to the Badem Chiflik airfield near Kavala (in Greece). They were tasked with anti-submarine patrols and air support for Italian shipping over the adjacent area of the Aegean Sea. In addition 9 Letov Š.328s based in Badem Chiflik provided the ground troops with air reconnaissance. At the Black Sea shores the "Galata" Fighter Orlyak was established at NAS Chaika, Varna, with the 10 Bf 109E-4s and 6 Avia B.534s. The S.328s were also used for anti-submarine patrols over the Black Sea, flying out of the Sarafovo and Balchik airfields. At the end of 1941 the inventory of His Majesty's Air Troops consisted of 609 aircraft of 40 different types.

On 22 June 1941, Germany invaded the Soviet Union, but Bulgaria refused to take part, although it did declare war with Great Britain and the United States of America in December 1941. Bulgaria's inaction against the Soviet Union meant that supplies of German aircraft slowed to a trickle, with only four aircraft delivered from January to September 1942.

The war declared by the Kingdom of Bulgaria against the US and Great Britain was a tragedy for the little country. The city of Sofia and Bulgarian towns and villages were hit by air strikes in late 1943 and in 1944. In all, 187 inhabited places were attacked, 45,000 destructive and incendiary bombs were dropped. There were about 2,000 casualties, and about 4700 wounded, 12,000 damaged or ruined buildings and the total losses were estimated at nearly 24 billion dollars. For the citizens of Sofia, the "Black" days were 14 and 24 November, 10 and 20 December 1943, and 10 January and 16, 24, 30 March and 17 April 1944 when large formations of B-17 and B-24 bombers ruined parts of the capital city including the central area. The Bulgarians also see successes. On 1 August 1943, an enormous armada of about 700 American Consolidated B-24 Liberator bombers flew over several Balkan countries their way to bomb "the taproot of German might", the giant oil refineries at Ploiești, Romania. Termed Operation Tidal Wave, the aircraft flew over Bulgarian territory and Bulgarian fighter pilots Sub-lieutenant Peter Bochev (5 victories), Captain Tschudomir Toplodolski (4 victories), Lieutenant Stoyan Stoyanov (5 victories) and Sublieutenant Hristo Krastev (1 victory) inflicted heavy losses on the bombers.

In total, about 23,000 enemy sorties were registered over Bulgaria in the years 1943–1944. Bulgarian pilots fought an enemy outnumbering them by 10 to 50 times. Some of the best pilots were Lieutenant Stoyanov, Captain Toplodolski, and Sub-Lieutenants Bochev, Cvetkov, and Damev. 19 Bulgarian pilots died in this war against the Allies. The Allies lost 60 planes, shot down by Bulgarian fighters and about 430 airmen, 325 of which were taken as POWs.

Reestablishment under the Communist government

The Bulgarian Air Force, along with other branches of the Sovietized Bulgarian People's Army, adopted the doctrine of the Soviet deep battle during the Cold War. The force expanded rapidly with deliveries of different types of combat aircraft. The first shipments of Soviet equipment arrived immediately after the end of World War II, mostly consisting of propeller-driven aircraft, such as the Ilyushin Il-2 (120 Il-2 and 10 Il-2U), the Ilyushin Il-10 and the Tupolev Tu-2. By 1954, these types were being withdrawn from service, as the Korean War marked the beginning of the jet fighter era and in 1955 a new wave of deliveries began, starting with the Mikoyan-Gurevich MiG-15. Later additions included Mikoyan-Gurevich MiG-17 and MiG-19 fighters and Ilyushin Il-28 bombers, as well as the Mil Mi-1, the first helicopter. These aircraft were withdrawn in the 1970s, when the last wave of modernization began.

In June 1979, the Mil Mi-24 Hind entered service through a significant re-equipment program and boosted the capabilities of the BAF. The Sukhoi Su-22 and Su-25 entered service in 1988 in the strike and reconnaissance role. 40 Su-25K/KUBs and 21 Su-22M4/UM-3s were delivered.

After the Cold War (1989–2004)

In 1993, the air regiments in Bezmer and Sadovo were experimentally transformed into "air bases" with the merger of the air regiments with the aviation-technical and airfield service battalions, that were independent from them. Around 1995 – 1996 all the air regiments were transformed into air bases (brigade equivalents) and two main commands were formed – Air Defence Command (Командване за противовъздушна отбрана), merging the two air defence divisions and the Tactical Aviation Command (Командване Тактическа Авиация), by reorganisation of the 10th Composite Aviation Corps, called and including into it the newly transformed into air bases training regiments in Shtraklevo and Kamenets. The regiment in Dolna Mitropoliya was disbanded.

With the end of the Cold war, Bulgaria's air force reduced to 226 aircraft. All MiG-25 fighters were grounded in 1991 and a large number of early MiG-21 variants were withdrawn from service and scrapped, with armament from the trainers for the MiG-21 and MiG-23 also being removed. In 1998, four air bases were closed down: Gabrovnitsa Air Base, Balchik Air Base, Uzundzhovo Air Base and Shtraklevo Air Base. In 2000, further air bases were closed, with the Stara Zagora (which operated Mi-24s) Air Base being suspended. Then, in 2001 three more bases were closed down: Dobrich Air Base, Ravnets Air Base and Cheshnegirovo Air Base. In 2003, Dobroslavtsi Air Base was also closed down and the MiG-23s were withdrawn from service as  they were more expensive to run than the MiG-21s. In February 2004 the Su-22s, which were stationed first in Dobrich then in Bezmer, were withdrawn.

Twenty-first century 
Since the early 2000s, Bulgaria has been trying actively to restructure its armed forces as a whole and a lot of attention has been placed on keeping the aging Soviet-era aircraft operational. In 2015, the last of the MiG-21s were put out of service and the attack and defence branches of the Bulgarian air force relied solely on MiG-29s. About 16 MiG-29 fighters were modernised in order to meet NATO standards. In January 2011, the Bulgarian Ministry of Defence issued a Request for Information (RFI) regarding the acquisition of eight multi-role fighters. The main competitors were expected to be the Eurofighter Typhoon, Dassault Rafale, Saab JAS 39 Gripen, Mikoyan MiG-29 or MiG-35. CAC/PAC JF-17 Thunder, Lockheed Martin F-16 and McDonnell Douglas F/A-18 Hornet. On 9 March 2011 the Swedish Government submitted its response to the RFI containing eight new Gripen C/D fighters. The Ministry of Defence extended the time limit for submittal of responses by two months due to the lack of responses from the other competitors.

Modern European transport helicopters were ordered and purchased in 2005 and until consequently 12 Eurocopter Cougar helicopters (8 to provide transport and 4 CSAR) joined the fleet. For the Navy 3 Eurocopter Panther were ordered and have been delivered.

In 2006 the Bulgarian government signed a contract with Alenia Aeronautica for the delivery of five C-27J Spartan transport aircraft in order to replace the older Soviet An-24 and An-26. The first Spartan arrived in 2007. Subsequently. the contract changed to the delivery of only 3 aircraft and the final example arrived on 31 March 2011.

On 11 November 2016, the Bulgarian government signed a 21.8 million euro contract for 10 MiG-29 engines (four new and six repaired), with the first pair scheduled to arrive by April 2017. The deal would eventually bring the number of active service MiG-29 aircraft from 9 to 14, as Bulgaria also announced it was looking to overhaul the fleet and buy eight new or second-hand fighter jets during the coming year.

In 2016, Bulgaria's government announced the Saab JAS 39 Gripen as the preferred candidate in the country's new combat aircraft competition. In 2016 Sofia issued a request for proposals for the purchase of eight multirole fighters, to be delivered by 2020. However, a new government postponed plans of acquiring new aircraft in May 2017.

In October 2018, potential suppliers responded to a renewed tender for aircraft, consisting of new F-16C/D Block 70 aircraft from Lockheed Martin, new F/A-18E/F Super Hornet aircraft from Boeing, used Eurofighter Typhoon aircraft from Italy and used Saab JAS 39 Gripen C/D from Sweden. France, Germany, Israel and Portugal did not respond to requests for used Eurofighter Typhoons and F-16 variants.

On 16 January 2019, the Bulgarian parliament approved the government's proposal to start negotiations with the US to purchase F-16C/D Block 70 aircraft.
On 3 June 2019, the U.S. State Department approved the possible sale of 8 F-16 aircraft to Bulgaria. The cost of the contract was estimated at $1.67 billion.
The deal was vetoed by the Bulgarian President, Rumen Radev on 23 July 2019, citing the need to find a broader consensus for the deal, sending the deal back to parliament,
but on 26 July the deal was again approved by parliament, overruling the veto, and this time was approved by Radev. In April 2020, Lockheed Martin officially awarded by the U.S. government to produce F-16 for Bulgaria and estimated to be completed in 2027.

Structure 

Branches of the air force include:
Fighter aviation
Fighter-bomber aviation
Ground attack aviation
Tactical reconnaissance aviation
Transport aviation
Missile aid defense troops
Radio-technical troops
Communications troops
Logistics and medical troops.

 Joint Forces Command, Sofia
 Military Command Center, Sofia
 Air Sovereignty Operations Center, Sofia, reports to NATO's Integrated Air Defense System CAOC Torrejón in Spain
 Air Forces Command, Sofia
 Command, Control and Surveillance Base (III)
 Headquarters
 1st Control and Surveillance Zone, Bozhurishte, Sofia Province
 2nd Control and Surveillance Zone, Trud, Plovdiv Province
 3rd Control and Surveillance Zone, Bratovo, Burgas Province
 CIS and Navigation Systems Squadron, Graf Ignatievo Air Base
 CIS and Navigation Systems Squadron, Krumovo Air Base
 CIS and Navigation Systems Squadron, Dolna Mitropoliya Air Base
 Air Force Meteorological Center
 Aviation Technical Base, Balchik Airfield (reserve airfield, former 6th Fighter Air Base)
 3rd Air Base, Graf Ignatievo Air Base (X)
 Headquarters and Headquarters Services
 1st Fighter Squadron, operating 12x MiG-29A, 3x MiG-29UB
 Aircraft Operational Support Ground Squadron
 Maintenance and Aircraft Repair Squadron
 Maintenance and Missile Repair Squadron
 Airfield Technical Support and Supply Squadron
 24th Air Base, Krumovo Air Base (X)
 Headquarters and Headquarters Services
 16th Air Transport Group, Vrazhdebna Air Base, operating 3x C-27J, 1x Pilatus PC-12, 2x Let L-410 Turbolet, 1x An-30, 2x An-26, 1x An-2
 Attack Helicopter Squadron, operating 6x Mi-24 
 2nd Transport Helicopter Squadron, operating 8x Eurocopter Cougar TTH, 4x Eurocopter Cougar CSAR, 3x Mi-17 
 Helicopter Training Flight, operating 6x Bell 206
 (Combat) Search and Rescue Flight, a company of infantrymen and medics
 Aircraft Operational Support Ground Squadron
 Maintenance and Aircraft Repair Squadron
 Airfield Technical Support and Supply Squadron
 Forward Deployment Air Base Bezmer (III)
 Headquarters and Headquarters Services 
 1st Ground Attack Squadron, operating 10x Su-25K, 4x Su-25UBK
 Aircraft Operational Support Ground Squadron
 Maintenance and Aircraft Repair Squadron 
 Airfield Technical Support and Supply Squadron
 Training Base "Georgi Benkovski", at Dolna Mitropoliya Air Base (III)
 operating 6x Pilatus PC-9 and 6x Aero L-39 Albatros(detached from the 3rd Air Base into a separate air base on 1 July 2017)
 Missile Air Defence Base, Sofia (III)
 Headquarters
 Missile Air Defence Battalion (S-300P), Bankya 
 Missile Air Defence Battalion (S-200), Kostinbrod
 Missile Air Defence Battalion (S125 Neva), Kichevo
 Missile Air Defence Battalion (S125 Neva), Chernomorets
 Mobile Missile Air Defence Battalion (2K12 Kub), Stara Zagora
 Missile Air Defence Shooting Range, Shabla
 Special Equipment Base (III), Bozhurishte suburb, Sofia
 Military Police Company of the Air Forces Command
 Air Forces Command Documentation Support Center

Air bases

Active
 3rd Fighter Air Base - Graf Ignatievo Air Base
 12th Training Air Base - Dolna Mitropoliya Air Base
 16th Transport Air Group - Vrazhdebna Air Base (military area of Sofia Airport)
 22nd Forward Deployment Air Base - Bezmer Air Base (becoming a joint Bulgarian-American training facility)
 24th Air Base - Krumovo Air Base (military area of Plovdiv Airport)

Closed
 1st Fighter Air Base - Dobroslavtsi Air Base
 2nd Fighter Air Base - Gabrovnitsa Air Base
 5th Fighter Air Base - Ravnets Air Base
 6th Fighter Air Base - Balchik Air Base
 11th Training Air Base - Shtraklevo Air Base
 12th Training Air Base - Kamenets Air Base
 21st Fighter Air Base - Uzundzhovo Air Base (formerly 4th FAB)
 23rd Helicopter Air Base - Stara Zagora Air Base
 25th Fighter-Bomber Air Base - Cheshnegirovo Air Base
 26th Reconnaissance Air Base - Dobrich Air Base
 Bozhurishte Airfield
 The city of Plovdiv used to house the headquarters of the Tactical Aviation Command and is still a place of significance as it houses a number of logistical and operational support units of the Bulgarian Air Force.
 The city of Burgas is the place around which the 3rd Missile Air Defence Brigade of the Bulgarian Air Force is deployed.
 63rd Independent Maritime Helicopter Air Base at Varna – Chayka Naval Air Base, which houses the Independent Maritime Helicopter Squadron.

Aircraft 
With the exception of the Navy's miniature helicopter fleet, the Air Force is responsible for all military aircraft in Bulgaria.
The BAF plans to retire most of its Soviet-era aircraft, keeping only the Mikoyan-Gurevich MiG-29 "Fulcrum" fleet which was modernized only recently, as well as its Mil Mi-24 gunships and Sukhoi Su-25s. The MiG-21s in service were scheduled to be replaced with possible American or European aircraft.

Current inventory 

Note: Three C-17 Globemaster III's are available through the Heavy Airlift Wing based in Hungary.

Ranks

Commissioned officers
The rank insignia of commissioned officers.

Other ranks
The rank insignia of non-commissioned officers and enlisted personnel.

See also
List of former Bulgarian military aircraft
28th Air Detachment
Bulgarian cosmonaut program
List of joint US-Bulgarian military bases

References

Bibliography

World Aircraft Information Files. Brightstar Publishing, London. File 327 Sheet 04

 (bilingual: Bulgarian/English)

External links
Official website 
Ministry of Defence of Bulgaria

 
Military units and formations established in 1906
1906 establishments in Bulgaria